Mohammad Tamim Nuristani is a businessman and politician from Nuristan Province of Afghanistan. Mohammad Tamim was the previous governor of Nuristan Province and replaced by Hafiz Abdul Qayyum.

Nuristani studied in Germany and later worked in the restaurant business in Brooklyn and California. He left his family in the United States after the 9/11 attacks to fight against terrorism and corruption. He is a member of the Kata tribe.

Notes

Governors of Nuristan Province
Living people
Nuristani people
People from Nuristan Province
Afghan emigrants to the United States
Afghan expatriates in Germany
1962 births